Zielonka is a town in Masovian Voivodeship (east-central Poland).

Zielonka may also refer to:

Zielonka, Poznań County in Greater Poland Voivodeship (west-central Poland)
Zielonka, Lower Silesian Voivodeship (south-west Poland)
Zielonka, Bydgoszcz County in Kuyavian-Pomeranian Voivodeship (north-central Poland)
Zielonka, Sępólno County in Kuyavian-Pomeranian Voivodeship (north-central Poland)
Zielonka, Gmina Tuchola in Kuyavian-Pomeranian Voivodeship (north-central Poland)
Zielonka, Gmina Cekcyn in Kuyavian-Pomeranian Voivodeship (north-central Poland)
Zielonka, Kraśnik County in Lublin Voivodeship (east Poland)
Zielonka, Łódź Voivodeship (central Poland)
Zielonka, Ryki County in Lublin Voivodeship (east Poland)
Zielonka, Subcarpathian Voivodeship (south-east Poland)
Zielonka, Świętokrzyskie Voivodeship (south-central Poland)
Zielonka, Przysucha County in Masovian Voivodeship (east-central Poland)
Zielonka, Konin County in Greater Poland Voivodeship (west-central Poland)
Zielonka, Działdowo County in Warmian-Masurian Voivodeship (north Poland)
Zielonka, Gołdap County in Warmian-Masurian Voivodeship (north Poland)
Zielonka, Szczytno County in Warmian-Masurian Voivodeship (north Poland)
Zielonka, West Pomeranian Voivodeship (north-west Poland)

Zielonka (surname)

See also
Puszcza Zielonka Landscape Park, Greater Poland Voivodeship